The American Elm cultivar Ulmus americana 'Patmore' was selected and raised by R. H. Patmore from a native tree in Brandon, Manitoba, Canada. It may be synonymous with another cultivar from the same source, known as 'Brandon'.

Description
'Patmore' (or 'Brandon') differs from most American Elms in possessing a pyramidal, as opposed to vase, form.

Pests and diseases
No other specific information available, but the species generally is highly susceptible to Dutch elm disease and Elm Yellows; it is also moderately preferred for feeding and reproduction by the adult Elm Leaf Beetle Xanthogaleruca luteola, and highly preferred for feeding by the Japanese Beetle Popillia japonica  in the United States.
U. americana is also the most susceptible of all the elms to verticillium wilt.

Cultivation
The tree is not known to have been cultivated beyond North America.

Synonymy
'Patmore Ascending', as 'grafted elm', Patmore Nursery Sales, Brandon, Cats. 1945 & 1955.
'Patmore Ascending Elm', Patmore Nursery Sales, Brandon, Cat. 1973.
'Exhibition Boulevard Elm', as 'grafted elm', Cat. 1958, and as 'grafted ascending elm' (1966).

Accessions

North America

Dominion Arboretum, Canada,  No details available.

References

External links
https://web.archive.org/web/20070507020319/http://www.extension.umn.edu/yardandgarden/ygbriefs/p425dutchelm-resistant.html Bevacqua, K. J. Dutch elm resistant cultivars.

American elm cultivar
Ulmus articles missing images
Ulmus